The Virginia Housing Development Authority (VHDA) is a self-supporting, not-for-profit organization created by the Commonwealth of Virginia in 1972, to help Virginians attain quality affordable housing. Mortgages are funded by bonds issued by VHDA, not by taxpayer dollars, and are available for homebuyers and developers of quality rental housing. The group teaches free homeownership classes, and helps people with disabilities and the elderly make their homes more livable. VHDA works with lenders, developers, local governments, community service organizations.

Funding sources 

Each year, VHDA raises funds through the capital markets to support lending for single family and multifamily loan programs. Investors purchase VHDA securities and loans, and this, in turn, generates their principal source of capital. These securities do not constitute a debt or obligation of the Commonwealth.

Organizational structure 

VHDA is a quasi-government agency. The governor appoints an 11-member Board of Commissioners. However, the authority is self-supporting and does not use tax dollars to fund its lending programs. Susan F. Dewey, its executive director since 1999, heads a leadership team of twelve divisional managers. VHDA has more than 300 full-time associates.

References

External links
 VHDA Website

Organizations based in Richmond, Virginia
1972 establishments in Virginia
Organizations established in 1972
Housing organizations in the United States